"Älvorna" is a song written by Lars "Dille" Diedricson, Marcos Ubeda and Dan Attlerud. The song was performed by Sarek at Melodifestivalen 2004, where it was knocked out at Andra chansen.

The single peaked at number eight on the Swedish Singles Chart. The song also charted at Svensktoppen for two weeks between 4 April-25 April 2004 with two positions at number ten before leaving the chart.

Track listing
Älvorna - 2:58
Älvorna (karaoke version) - 2:58

Charts

References 

2004 singles
Melodifestivalen songs of 2004
Swedish-language songs
Songs written by Marcos Ubeda
Songs written by Lars Diedricson
2004 songs